The Big Job is a 1965 British comedy film. It starred Sid James, Dick Emery, Joan Sims, Sylvia Syms, Jim Dale and Lance Percival.

The Big Job shared its cast and production team with the Carry On films, but the film was not officially part of the Carry On series, despite being a typical Carry On format. The film was photographed in black and white, while the Carry On films from the mid 1960s were in colour.

Plot
The story begins in London in 1950. A gang of robbers led by the self-proclaimed George "The Great" Brain rob a bank, stealing £50,000. They choose a hearse as a getaway vehicle and are pursued and caught by the police. However, before being caught they manage to conceal the money (which is in a briefcase) in the trunk of a hollow tree, before all three are arrested. The gang are sentenced to serve fifteen years in Wormwood Scrubs prison.

Upon their release in 1965, the gang go back to the spot where they had left the money, only to find it is now a new town, and a housing estate has been built around the tree. They are dismayed that the tree now lies in the grounds of the local police station - but it is invitingly close to the boundary wall. George and his gang take up rooms in a nearby house rented from a widow and her daughter who also live there. They rent two double rooms on the first floor. In order to provide a respectable front, George reluctantly agrees to marry his longtime girlfriend Myrtle Robbins who is not so enamoured about the idea of recovering the loot and wants George to settle down with her.

The incompetent criminals fail in their numerous attempts to get over or under the wall, all the while trying to conceal their true activities from their landlady, her daughter and a local police constable who also stays there. Eventually, when the men have botched an attempt to tunnel into the grounds, the frustrated women hatch their own plot to gain the money, and succeed, only to find that the money has been shredded by little bustards nesting in the tree.

Cast
Sid James as George 'The Great' Brain 
Sylvia Syms as Myrtle Robbins 
Dick Emery as Frederick 'Booky' Binns 
Joan Sims as Mildred Gamely 
Lance Percival as Timothy 'Dipper' Day 
Jim Dale as Harold 
Deryck Guyler as Police Sergeant 
Edina Ronay as Sally Gamely 
Reginald Beckwith as Register Office Official 
Michael Ward as Undertaker 
Brian Rawlinson as Henry Blobbitt 
David Horne as Judge 
Frank Forsyth as Bank Cashier 
Frank Thornton as Bank Official 
Wanda Ventham as Dot Franklin

Critical reception
Time Out wrote, "this 'unofficial' Carry On reproduces the familiar formula of its virtually institutionalised predecessors."

Production
Peter Rogers had a script for what eventually would be The Big Job, but elected not to incorporate it into the Carry On series. Of the principal cast, only Sylvia Syms and Dick Emery did not feature in at least one Carry On.  The film was principally shot at Pinewood Studios, with exteriors at Silver Hill, Chalfont St Giles (the bank), Fulmer and Bracknell (residential and town streets) and Iver Heath, Buckinghamshire (countryside).

See also
 Blue Streak, a 1999 film with a similar plot

References

External links

1965 films
Films directed by Gerald Thomas
Films shot at Pinewood Studios
Films produced by Peter Rogers
Films with screenplays by Talbot Rothwell
1960s crime comedy films
British crime comedy films
1965 comedy films
1960s English-language films
Films shot in Buckinghamshire
1960s British films